John James Gallagher (January 19, 1909 — September 16, 1981) was a Canadian professional ice hockey player who played 204 games in the National Hockey League with the Montreal Maroons, Detroit Red Wings, and New York Americans between 1930 and 1939. He won the Stanley Cup with Detroit in 1937.

Career statistics

Regular season and playoffs

References

External links
 

1909 births
1981 deaths
Canadian ice hockey defencemen
Detroit Olympics (IHL) players
Detroit Red Wings players
Ice hockey people from Ontario
Montreal Maroons players
New York Americans players
Sportspeople from Kenora
Pittsburgh Hornets players
Stanley Cup champions
Windsor Bulldogs (1929–1936) players
Canadian expatriate ice hockey players in the United States